Civil inattention is the process whereby strangers who are in close proximity demonstrate that they are aware of one another, without imposing on each other – a recognition of the claims of others to a public space, and of their own personal boundaries.

In practice
Civil inattention is the term introduced by Erving Goffman to describe the care taken to maintain public order among strangers and thus to make anonymised life in cities possible.  Rather than either ignoring or staring at others, civil inattention involves the unobtrusive and peaceful scanning of others so as to allow for neutral interaction. Through brief eye contact with an approaching stranger, a person both acknowledges their presence and forecloses the possibility of more personal contact or of  conversation.

Civil inattention is thus a means of making privacy possible within a crowd through culturally accepted forms of self-distancing.  Seemingly (though not in reality) effortless, such civility is a way of shielding others from personal claims in public – an essential feature of the abstract, impersonal relationships demanded by the open society.

Negative aspects
Civil inattention can lead to feelings of loneliness or invisibility, and it reduces the tendency to feel responsibility for the well-being of others. Newcomers to urban areas are often struck by the impersonality of such routines, which they may see as callous and uncaring, rather than as necessary for the peaceful co-existence of close-packed millions.

Insanity of place
Goffman saw many classic indications of madness as violations of the norm of civil inattention speaking to strangers, or shying away from every passing glance.

See also

References

Further reading
 
 
 
 

Attention
Civil society
Human behavior